Catherine O'Neill, Countess of Tyrone was an Irish aristocrat. Born Catherine Mageniss she was the final (different estimates say the fourth or fifth) wife of Hugh O'Neill, Earl of Tyrone, one of the leading Gaelic lords in Ireland during the late Elizabethan and early Stuart eras. Catherine was part of the Magennis dynasty, a powerful family in County Down The marriage, like Tyrone's earlier relationships, was a political one.

In 1607 she accompanied her husband during the Flight of the Earls, which took them into exile in Italy. It was later suggested that once in Rome she had an affair with Robert Lombard, the nephew of Peter Lombard, the Catholic Archbishop of Armagh who was noted supporter of the Earl. Robert Lombard was a spy for the Crown, and may have attempted to get information from the Countess about her husband which he relayed on to London and Dublin.

Amongst her sons were John O'Neill and Conn O'Neill. John succeeded his father as Earl, following Hugh's death in 1616.

References

Bibliography
 McCavitt, John. The Flight of the Earls. Gill & MacMillan, 2002.

Irish emigrants to Italy
17th-century Irish people
Flight of the Earls